Xu Gang (born January 28, 1984) is a Chinese former professional cyclist, who rode professionally between 2005 and 2016. He made his Grand Tour debut at the 2015 Giro d'Italia.

Major results
2005
3rd Overall Tour of South China Sea
2007
1st  Road race, National Road Championships
2008
1st Overall Tour of South China Sea
2009
1st  Road race, National Road Championships
2011
1st Stage 3 Tour de Korea
2012
1st  Road race, National Road Championships

References

External links

1984 births
Living people
Chinese male cyclists
Cyclists at the 2010 Asian Games
Cyclists from Shanghai
Asian Games competitors for China